Tătărășeni may refer to:

 Tătărășeni, a village in Pleșeni Commune, Cantemir district, Moldova
 Tătărășeni, a village in Havârna Commune, Botoșani County, Romania
 Tătărășeni, a Romanian name for Tarashany, Chernivtsi Oblast, Ukraine

See also 
 Tătaru (disambiguation)
 Tătărești (disambiguation)
 Tătărăștii (disambiguation)